Alyona Aleksandrovna Mamina (née Tamkova) (born Mai 30, 1990 in Sverdlovsk) is a Russian track and field sprinter who specialises in the 400 metres.

Achievements

External links 

1990 births
Living people
Sportspeople from Yekaterinburg
Russian female sprinters
European Athletics Championships medalists
Universiade medalists in athletics (track and field)
Universiade gold medalists for Russia
Universiade silver medalists for Russia
European Games competitors for Russia
Athletes (track and field) at the 2019 European Games
Authorised Neutral Athletes at the World Athletics Championships
Medalists at the 2013 Summer Universiade